Abdullah Hussein Al-Dosari (born 19 April 1965) is a Bahraini long-distance runner. He competed in the men's 5000 metres at the 1992 Summer Olympics.

References

External links
 

1965 births
Living people
Place of birth missing (living people)
Bahraini male long-distance runners
Bahraini male steeplechase runners
Olympic male long-distance runners
Olympic male steeplechase runners
Olympic athletes of Bahrain
Athletes (track and field) at the 1988 Summer Olympics
Athletes (track and field) at the 1992 Summer Olympics